Pilur is a village on the Albanian Riviera in Vlorë County, Albania. It is part of the municipality Himarë.

Demographics 
The village of Pilur is inhabited by an Orthodox Albanian population and speak Albanian.

History
In 1720, the villages of Himara, Palasa, Ilias, Vuno, Pilur and Qeparo refused to submit to the Pasha of Delvina.

References

Populated places in Himara
Villages in Vlorë County
Albanian Ionian Sea Coast
Labëria